The Minister of Finance of Latvia is a member of the Cabinet of Ministers of Latvia, and is the political leader of the Ministry of Finance of Latvia. Arvils Ašeradens is the current officeholder since 14 December 2022.

Ministers from 1926 to 1940
Arturs Alberings, 10 September 1926 — 18 December 1926
Voldemārs Bastjānis, 19 December 1926 — 23 January 1928
Pēteris Juraševskis, 24 January 1928 — 7 March 1928
Roberts Liepiņš, 8 March 1928 — 30 November 1928
Ansis Petrevics, 1 December 1928 — 26 March 1931
Jānis Annuss, 27 March 1931  — 6 December 1931
Gustavs Zemgals, 11 December 1931 — 20 February 1932
Marģers Skujenieks, 21 February 1932 — 23 March 1933
Jānis Annuss, 24 March 1933 — 16 March 1934
Ēvalds Rimbenieks, 17 March 1934 — 15 May 1934
Ludvigs Ēķis, 16 May 1934 — 15 June 1938
Alfrēds Valdmanis, 16 June 1938 — 25 October 1939
Jānis Kaminskis, 26 October 1939 — 16 June 1940
Source:

Ministers since 1990

Source:

References

 
Finance